Pines Lake is an unincorporated community on a lake in Wayne, in Passaic County, New Jersey, United States. Many of the original homes were modified log cabins. A large number of these log cabins, built of American chestnut in the 1930s, are still occupied as year-round homes. Gradually the neighborhood became approximately 500 high end to moderate suburban homes. It has a grammar school, Pines Lake School and its residents can send their high school aged children to Wayne Hills High School.

An interesting feature of the lake is the one lane road that passes over the dam, giving a view down into "the Glen", a steep sided ravine which is maintained as a park.  There are rare tiger salamanders and native ferns.  Marine fossils have occasionally been found in the Glen and on properties surrounding the lake. An undeveloped area near the southern end of the lake has long been believed to contain an Indian burial ground.

The Lenni-Lenape lived in the area of Pines Lake prior to European settlement.  Stone mounds and other signs of the Lenni-Lenape are visible in the forests and the undeveloped areas around Pines Lake.  Many of the surrounding roads in Pines Lake are named after Indian tribes in honor of them. This includes Osceola Road, Iroquois Trail, Algonquin Trail, Mohawk Trail, and others. 

Despite its name, there are very few natural pine trees around Pines Lake.  The area is mostly forested in black oak, white oak, and red oak along with flowering dogwoods and American beech.  There are groves of mature Eastern hemlocks that may have been mistaken for pine trees.  The Glen is forested with mature oaks, hemlocks, and beech, including American sycamores along the stream banks.

Pines Lake has several community beaches on the lake and an active community life,  centered on swimming, tennis, and sailing. One such beach is the Sunny Ridge Beach, at the foot of Sunny Ridge Road, which serves residents in the immediate vicinity. Catch and release fishing is offered to private association members. The lake is stocked with large-mouth bass, sunfish, and Northern pike.  The lake supports flocks of mallards, coots, swans and other ducks, herons, and waterfowl.  On the weekend nearest July 4 each year a community celebration is held, including the "Baby" Parade—a costume parade for children walking, or on decorated bicycles, and on homemade floats—culminating in a beach-side picnic. Children living in Pines Lake are eligible to participate in the summer program, several weeks of supervised play and learning activities sponsored by the Pines Lake Association. Another large community event is the annual Lobster Bash sponsored by the Sailing Club which is always sold out. These and other events are held at the South Beach Pavilion, built in the 1980s. The local Pines Lake swimming team has a large following.  

The Pines Lake community is also the location of Laurelwood Arboretum, a  botanically diverse property.  Laurelwood features woodland trails and gardens, wildlife, two ponds, streams and hundreds of varieties of rhododendrons, azaleas and other unusual species of plants and trees. Gravel paths wind and connect through the Arboretum, making it an ideal destination for hikers, runners, birdwatchers, plant enthusiasts and photographers. Once a commercial nursery, Laurelwood Arboretum is now maintained as a public park through a partnership between the Township of Wayne and the non-profit organization Friends of Laurelwood Arboretum, Inc (FOLA).

Demographics

References

Wayne, New Jersey
Unincorporated communities in Passaic County, New Jersey
Unincorporated communities in New Jersey